Trinkle Mansion is an historic building located in Wytheville, Virginia that is now a four-room bed and breakfast. It is a contributing property to the Wytheville Historic District.

History
The Trinkle Mansion was built in 1912 by William Trinkle, the son of a prominent Wytheville family.  William married a young woman by the name of Ethel and the young couple had two young children, a boy and a girl.  William was a wealthy farm owner that oversaw  of land.  The house was built in a Classical Revival style and had unprecedented technology for the time period like a steam heating system and a built-in central vacuum system.  The house is now on the National Register of Historic Places and the Virginia Landmarks Register as part of the Wytheville Historic District, added to the national register in 1994.

The Locale
Wytheville is a small town located in western Virginia  The town contains a number of historical sites like the Haller-Gibboney Rock House Museum, Edith Bolling Wilson Birthplace Museum, and Wolf Creek Indian Village & Museum.  There are also a number of hiking and biking trails that surround the town.

See also
National Register of Historic Places listings in Wythe County, Virginia

References

External links
Trinkle Mansion Bed & Breakfast

Houses on the National Register of Historic Places in Virginia
Houses in Wythe County, Virginia
Historic district contributing properties in Virginia
Houses completed in 1912
Neoclassical architecture in Virginia
1912 establishments in Virginia
National Register of Historic Places in Wythe County, Virginia